Rasukutty is a 1992 Indian Tamil-language comedy drama film, written and directed by K. Bhagyaraj and produced by Meena Panchu Arunachalam. The film stars Bhagyaraj and Aishwarya, with Manorama and Kalyan Kumar in supporting roles. It was released on 25 October 1992. The film was remade in Hindi as Raja Babu (1994), and in Telugu as Abbai Gari Pelli.

Plot

Cast 
 Bhagyaraj as Rasukutty
 Aishwarya as Rukkumani
 Manorama as Rasukutty's mother
 Kalyan Kumar as Rasukutty's father Periyapannai
 Jagan as Sembuli
 Mounika as Poovaatha
Nalinikanth as Periyapannai's younger brother Sengodan
 Suryakanth as Nalinikanth's elder son
Junior Baliah as Soona Baana
 Bailvan Ranganathan as Rasukutty's uncle
 Nandhagopal as Ammavasai

Production
Bhagyaraj agreed to do a film for Panchu Arunachalam which eventually became Rasukutty. The film saw Bhagyaraj and Ilayaraj reuniting after a brief misunderstanding. The film was completely shot at Mettur.

Soundtrack 
Lyrics were written by Vaali and Panchu Arunachalam.

Release and reception 
Rasukutty was released on 25 October 1992, Diwali day. Ayyappa Prasad of The Indian Express wrote the film "has a very interesting storyline with Bhagyaraj giving a very good performance". K. Vijiyan of New Straits Times wrote, "We see the old Bhagiaraj we used to love in Rasukutti". C. R. K. of Kalki wrote that the humorous dialogues and fast paced screenplay prove the brand of Bhagyaraj but the sudden twists towards the end were exaggerated. Jagan, who portrayed a character named Sembuli, acquired the sobriquet "Sembuli Jagan" after acting in this film.

References

Bibliography

External links 
 

1990s Tamil-language films
1992 comedy-drama films
1992 films
Films directed by K. Bhagyaraj
Films scored by Ilaiyaraaja
Indian comedy-drama films
Tamil films remade in other languages